The Winnipeg Goldeyes are a minor-league baseball team based in Winnipeg, Manitoba, Canada.  The Goldeyes play in the American Association of Professional Baseball, which they joined in 2011. Previously, the Goldeyes were members of the Northern League from 1994 until 2010. The Goldeyes were champions of the Northern League in 1994. They are also three-time champions of the American Association; having won in 2012, and back-to-back in 2016 and 2017. The team is named after the goldeye, a fish usually served as a smoked delicacy and commonly called Winnipeg goldeye.

History

There have been two separate and distinct baseball teams based out of Winnipeg to use the Goldeyes name, each playing in different incarnations of the Northern League. They first played in the original Northern League from 1954 until 1964. During that time, the Goldeyes were a minor league affiliate of the St. Louis Cardinals and they won the league championship three times (1957, 1959, and 1960).  The Goldeyes returned to the Short Season-A Northern League for one season, 1969, as an affiliate of the expansion Kansas City Royals, but they did not return in 1970, and the entire league shut down after the 1971 season.

The Goldeyes name was resurrected in 1994 when the independent league Rochester Aces of the new Northern League relocated to Winnipeg. It was decided the team would take on the name of the former Winnipeg team in honor of the past.  In their inaugural season in Winnipeg, the new Goldeyes captured the Northern League championship.

The Goldeyes became the longest tenured franchise in the Northern League following the departure of the St. Paul Saints, Sioux City Explorers, and Sioux Falls Canaries to the breakaway American Association in 2005; however, the team would jump to the American Association after the 2010 season.  The Goldeyes captured their first American Association championship in 2012, sweeping the Wichita Wingnuts in the finals.

The Goldeyes fueled their rivalry with Wichita in 2016, when they defeated the Wingnuts in game five in Wichita for their second American Association championship. Next season, the teams would meet again; this matchup looked as if the Wingnuts won the series in game four after a ground-out won the game and the team began celebrating on the mound. However, the umpire had called a balk and the strike was re-thrown; the Goldeyes tied the game later in the at-bat and forced a marathon 17-inning game. This was the longest game in American Association history, which they won to play a game five. The Goldeyes would seal back-to-back championships with an 18–2 victory over Wichita at home in Winnipeg.

In 2020, the league announced that the Goldeyes would compete as one of six teams in a condensed 60-game season as a result of the COVID-19 pandemic. However, they would not play games at Shaw Park, and were instead based at Newman Outdoor Field (thus sharing a home field with the Fargo Moorhead RedHawks). Due to continued border restrictions, the Goldeyes announced plans to initially play home games during the 2021 season out of The Ballpark at Jackson in Jackson, Tennessee, the former home of the Jackson Generals. However, Jackson Mayor Scott Conger notified the teams that the Generals lost their authority to manage the city-owned ballpark when they lost their affiliation with Minor League Baseball and that they were issued an eviction notice to leave the stadium after May 30, nine days after the Goldeyes' May 21 home opener.  On June 1, the Goldeyes entered into a new license agreement with the city to continue use of the facility. On July 22, the Goldeyes were granted permission from the federal and provincial governments to return to Shaw Park for games beginning on August 3.

Stadium
From 1994 to 1998, the Goldeyes played their homes games at Winnipeg Stadium, a Canadian football stadium retrofitted for baseball.  The team moved into CanWest Global Park (now Shaw Park), their own baseball-only facility, prior to the 1999 season.  Due to the COVID-19 pandemic, the Goldeyes played its 2020 season home games at Newman Outdoor Field, and April-July home games in the 2021 season at The Ballpark at Jackson.

Season-by-season records

Playoffs
1994 season: Defeated Sioux City 3–1 to win championship
1995 season: Lost to St. Paul 3–1 in championship
1996 season: Lost to Fargo-Moorhead 2–1 in semifinals
1997 season: Defeated Fargo-Moorhead 3–2 in semifinals; lost to Duluth-Superior 3–2 in championship
1998 season: Lost to Fargo-Moorhead 3–1 in semifinals
1999 season: Defeated Sioux City 3–0 in quarterfinals; defeated Fargo-Moorhead 3–0 in semifinals; lost to Albany-Colonie 3–1 in championship
2000 season: Lost to Fargo-Moorhead 3–0 in quarterfinals
2001 season: Defeated Fargo-Moorhead 3–2 in quarterfinals; defeated Lincoln 3–1 in semifinals; lost to New Jersey 3–1 in championship
2002 season: Defeated Lincoln 3–2 in quarterfinals; defeated Sioux City 3–1 in semifinals; lost to New Jersey 3–1 in championship
2003 season: Defeated St. Paul 3–2 in semifinals; lost to Fargo-Moorhead 3–1 in championship
2006 season: Lost to Fargo-Moorhead 3–2 in semifinals
2007 season: Lost to Gary SouthShore 3–2 in semifinals
2008 season: Lost to Gary SouthShore 3–1 in semifinals
2009 season: Lost to Fargo-Moorhead 3–2 in semifinals
2011 season: Lost to St. Paul 3–2 in semifinals
2012 season: Defeated Fargo-Moorhead 3–0 in semifinals; defeated Wichita 3–0 to win championship
2014 season: Lost to Lincoln 3–2 in semifinals
2016 season: Defeated St. Paul 3–2 in semifinals; defeated Wichita 3–2 to win championship
2017 season: Defeated Lincoln 3–1 in semifinals; defeated Wichita 3–2 to win championship

Roster

Retired numbers
 5, Brian Duva
 6, Max Poulin
 21, Donnie Smith
 22, Hal Lanier
 31, Andrew "Ace" Walker

Notable alumni
 Dann Bilardello (1994)
 Pete Coachman (1994)
  Rich Thompson (1994)
 Jim Wilson (1994)
 Jeff Bittiger (1994–1995)
 Mike Cather (1995)
 Steve Springer (1995)
 Brad Komminsk (1996)
 Terry Lee (1995–1997)
 Steve Pegues (1997)
 Jeff Zimmerman (1997)
 Jeff Sparks (1997–1998)
 Scott Lydy (1998)
 Dwayne Hosey (1999)
 Warren Newson (2000)
 Erik Plantenberg (2000)
 Luis Ortiz (2001)
 Bobby Madritsch (2002)
 Pete Rose Jr. (2002)
 George Sherrill (2002–2003)
 Jalal Leach (2003)
 Wes Chamberlain (1998, 2000, 2004)
 Amaury García (2004)
 Wilfredo Rodríguez (2004)
 Andy Stewart (2004)
 David Manning (2005)
 Chad Meyers (2005)
 Shawn Sedlacek (2005)
 Reggie Harris (2006)
 Julius Matos (2006)
 Jimmy Hurst (2006–2007)
 Chris Latham (2007)
 Walter Young (2007)
 Brandon Kintzler (2007
–2008)
 Bill Pulsipher (2009)
 Juan Díaz (2009–2010)
 Bobby Korecky (2010)
 Donzell McDonald (2010)
 Brian Myrow (1999–2001, 2011)
 Ian Thomas (2009–2011)
 Jamie Vermilyea (2011)
 Bárbaro Cañizares (2012)
 Chris Roberson (2012)
 Yurendell DeCaster (2012–2013)
 Tyler Graham (2013)
 Ray Sadler (2013–2014)
 Ryan Bollinger (2014)
 Mike Wilson (2015)
 Jailen Peguero (2015–2016)
 Winston Abreu (2016)
 Evan Rutckyj (2017)
 Tyler Herron (2018)
 Tommy Mendonca (2018)
 Reynaldo Rodríguez (2018)
 Dave Sappelt (2018)
 Brennan Bernardino (2018)
 Reggie Abercrombie (2014–2019)
 Josh Romanski (2016-2019)
 Willy García (2019)
 Brandon Cumpton (2020)
 Josh Lucas (2020)
 Darnell Sweeney (2020)
 Eric Wood (2020)
 Kyle Martin (2019–2021)
 Bud Norris (2021)

See also
List of baseball teams in Canada

References

Sources
 Goldeyes official website
 nlfan.com – yearly league standings and awards

External links
 Winnipeg Goldeyes official site
 CJNU broadcasts all Winnipeg Goldeyes games
 nlfan.com Winnipeg Goldeyes Guide
 nlfan.com Rochester Aces Guide

 
American Association of Professional Baseball teams
Northern League (baseball, 1993–2010) teams
Baseball teams established in 1994